?! (pronounced Punto interrogativo punto esclamativo, "Interrogation point exclamation point") is the first studio album by Italian rapper Caparezza, after two releases published under the former stage name Mikimix.

Description 
It is the rapper's first official publication since the interruption of his musical activity as Mikimix. The music album has fourteen tracks, many of which are remakes of songs originally published in Caparezza's two demos, Ricomincio da Capa and Zappa.

There are some samples on the disc. Intro contains an item of Guida nel suono a tre dimensioni del Sei Fasi Superstereo, Tutto ciò che c'è contains a piece of the song La filastrocca by Raoul Casadei, and La fitta sassaiola dell'ingiuria contains part of the song Confessioni di un malandrino by Angelo Branduardi.

Reception 

Reviewing the album for Allmusic, Jason Birchmeier wrote, "The Italian rapper drops his rhymes with just as much fluency and dexterity as his American peers throughout the album. [...]  Caparezza's mastery of the Italian dialect [makes] this album so stunning."

Track listing

References

External links 
 ?! on Spotify

2000 albums
Caparezza albums
Italian-language albums
Virgin Records albums